"Made for You" may refer to:

 "Made for You" (Alexander Cardinale song), 2016
 "Made for You" (Joakim Lundell song), 2018
 "Made for You" (Jake Owen song), 2019